Chinchao District is one of twelve districts of the province Huánuco in Peru. Its seat is Acomayo.

See also
 Aqumayu
 Qiwllaqucha
 Wanakawri

References